This is a list of flags used in Portugal.

National flag

Autonomous Regions

Municipalities

Government flags

Military flags

Historical flags

Royal and national flags

Portuguese Macau

Political flags

Ethnic groups flags

House flags

See also

 A Portuguesa
 Coat of arms of Portugal
 List of personal standards of the Kings of Portugal
 List of Portuguese municipal flags
 List of Macanese flags
 Portuguese vexillology

External links 
 

Portugal
Flags of Portugal
Flags